Matthew Richardson is the Charles E. Simon Professor of Applied Economics and Professor of Finance in the Finance Department at the Leonard N. Stern School of Business of New York University (NYU). 
He is also the Director of Alternative Investments at the Salomon Center for the Study of Financial Institutions at NYU. and a Research Associate of the National Bureau of Economic Research.  Richardson is a co-editor of the Annual Review of Financial Economics.

Richardson has co-edited or co-authored four books on the financial crisis of 2007–2008 and the modernization of insurance regulations:  Restoring Stability: How to Repair a Failed System (2009), 
Regulating Wall Street: The Dodd-Frank Act and the New Architecture of Global Finance (2010),  
Guaranteed to Fail: Fannie Mae, Freddie Mac and the Debacle of Mortgage Finance (2011) 
and Modernizing Insurance Regulation (2014).

Education 
Richardson received both his B.A and M.S. in Economics concurrently from the University of California at Los Angeles in 1984.
He received his Ph.D. in finance from the Graduate School of Business at Stanford University in  1989.

Career 
Richardson was previously at the Wharton School of the University of Pennsylvania.
Richardson joined the Leonard N. Stern School of Business of New York University in 1995. He has been the Sidney Homer Director of the Salomon Center for the Study of Financial Institutions at NYU, He is the Charles E. Simon Professor of Applied Economics and Professor of Finance in the Finance Department at the Leonard N. Stern School of Business of New York University (NYU).

Impersonation 
In 2004, Richardson was apparently inadvertently impersonated by a British University of Oxford engineering undergraduate by the same name, who took up an offer to perform a series of lectures in Beijing. The student used an  A-level t textbook to "blag" through two days of lectures before fleeing from his Chinese audience and interpreter.

References

External links
Prof. Richardson's Homepage
Professor Matthew Riichardson on The Daily Show with Jon Stewart where he  likens America's subprime mortgage crisis to the aftermath of a Godzilla and King Kong battle in downtown Tokyo.

Living people
New York University faculty
21st-century American economists
21st-century American male writers
21st-century American non-fiction writers
American economics writers
National Bureau of Economic Research
University of California alumni
Stanford University alumni
Wharton School of the University of Pennsylvania faculty
Year of birth missing (living people)
Annual Reviews (publisher) editors